The National Board for Technical Education, otherwise known as NBTE, is a board of education which supervises, regulates and oversees educational programmes offered by technical institutions at secondary, polytechnic and monotechnic levels through an accreditation process. It was established by Act No 9 of 11 July 1977 with the aim of "providing standardised minimum guide curricula for Technical and Vocational Education and Training".

The National Board for Technical Education (NBTE) has granted approval to the Federal Polytechnic, Ede, for the commencement of Open and Distance Flexible in Ede E-Learning.

See also
 Nigerian Federal Ministry of Education
 Education in Nigeria

References

Government agencies established in 1977
Educational organizations based in Nigeria
1977 establishments in Nigeria
Government agencies of Nigeria